KWQW (98.3 FM, "The Vibe") is a contemporary hit radio radio station licensed to Boone, Iowa and serving the Des Moines area. The station is currently owned by Cumulus Media. KWQW's studios are in Urbandale, along with Cumulus' other stations: KGGO, KJJY, KHKI, and KBGG. Its transmitter is located near Big Creek Lake southwest of Sheldahl.

History
The station began as KWBG-FM in 1975, a local Boone, Iowa radio station. In 1991, the station started to target the Des Moines, Iowa area with a country music format with call letters KIAB "K98" from 1991 to 1993.  The station then became KRUU known as "The Rooster" from 1993–1996, also with a country music format before becoming KRKQ in 1996.

As KRKQ the station took on the nickname of "98 Rock," featuring a classic rock format that competed with longtime ratings leader KGGO as well as the Bob & Tom Show.  In 2000 the station's format was tweaked to classic hits as "Magic 98.3" after owner Barnstable Communications acquired KGGO. A short time later, the format was changed to adult contemporary as "98.3 the River."

Barnstable sold all of its Des Moines stations to Wilks Broadcasting in 2001; the stations were sold to Citadel Broadcasting in 2003. On November 11 of that year, Citadel changed KRKQ's format to talk radio as "WOW-FM, the Capital's Big Talker." The Bob & Tom Show was the only program that carried over to the new format. The station's call letters were changed to KBGG-FM shortly afterwards. On December 28, 2004, the call letters became KWQW. The Bob & Tom Show aired on the station from October 31, 1996 to December 30, 2011, when it was moved to KGGO. In 2005, Paul Harvey became part of the station's lineup after WHO dropped the show.

Citadel merged with Cumulus Media in September 2011. 

In April 2014, KWQW rebranded as "98.3 The Torch" but continued with a Conservative Talk format. "The Torch" primarily carried Cumulus Media Networks' in-house offerings, including Dennis Miller, The Savage Nation, The Mark Levin Show, John Batchelor, and Red Eye Radio, all in their live time slots. (The station did not carry Imus in the Morning or Herman Cain.) A local morning show, The Morning Drive, aired (as its name indicated) in morning drive time, and the station also carried the last two hours of the Glenn Beck Program live (WHO, whose sister company Premiere Networks owns Beck's rights, does not carry Beck). The station served as an affiliate for the Kansas City Chiefs.

On October 5, 2015, at Noon, KWQW flipped to classic hip hop as "98.3 The Vibe". The first song on The Vibe was "2 Legit 2 Quit" by MC Hammer.

On May 28, 2021, at Midnight, KWQW flipped to Top 40/CHR, maintaining the "Vibe" branding.

References

External links
Official 98.3 The Vibe website

WQW
Contemporary hit radio stations in the United States
Cumulus Media radio stations
Urbandale, Iowa
Radio stations established in 1975